PPO may refer to:

Law enforcement 

 Personal Protection Officer
 Personal Protection Order
 Police protection order 
 Prisons and Probation Ombudsman
 Public prosecutor's office

Chemistry and biochemistry 

 2,5-Diphenyloxazole, an organic scintillator
 Polyphenol oxidases, a family of enzymes

 Poly(p-phenylene oxide), a type of plastic

 Propylene oxide, an industrial chemical
 Protoporphyrinogen oxidase, an enzyme
 Pure plant oil

Other uses 
 Pfadfinder und Pfadfinderinnen Österreichs, an Austrian Scouting organization
 Planned purchase order, part of the purchasing process
 Polish Patent Office
 Political Parties Order, 2002, a chief executive order in Pakistan
 Preferred provider organization, a type of health insurance plan
 Toray Pan Pacific Open, a Women's Tennis Association tournament 
 Philippine Philharmonic Orchestra
 Abbreviation of Praefectus Praetorio (Praetorian Prefect), found on inscriptions
 Proximal Policy Optimization, a family of reinforcement learning algorithms (part of computer science)
 Pédagogie par Objectifs-Melkart 2021
 Populist Party Ontario, a minor provincial political party in Ontario, Canada